Chengjiangaspis chengjiangensis is an extinct redlichiid trilobite that lived during the early part of the Botomian stage, of the Early Cambrian period, which has lasted approximately 524 to 518.5 million years. It is a rare fossil found in strata just above the Maotianshan Shale, where the Chengjiang Biota are found.

References

Cambrian trilobites
Redlichiidae
Redlichiida genera